Kilimovo (Kilem) is a rural locality (a selo) and the administrative centre of Kilimovsky Selsoviet, Buzdyaksky District, Bashkortostan, Russia. The population was 797 as of 2010. There are 6 streets.

Geography 
Kilimovo is located 27 km north of Buzdyak (the district's administrative centre) by road. 6-ye Alkino is the nearest rural locality.

References 

Rural localities in Buzdyaksky District